Wang Guanyi (Chinese: 王冠伊 born 9 April 1989) is a Chinese former professional footballer.

Club career
Wang Guanyi would start his professional football career with third tier football club Tianjin Locomotive before being scouted by top tier side Shanghai Shenhua, who he eventually joined at the beginning of the 2010 league season with team mates Feng Renliang and Song Boxuan. The Head coach Miroslav Blažević would then give Wang Guanyi his debut in a league game against Tianjin Teda F.C. on August 18, 2010 in a 1-0 victory where he came on as late substitute.

On November 7, 2012, Wang Guanyi's hometown club Tianjin Teda F.C. has confirmed that they have agreed to sign him from Shanghai Shenhua, on a free transfer and will sign a three-year contract with him. In March 2016, Wang was loaned to Tianjin Locomotive until 31 December 2016.

On 5 January 2017, Wang moved to League One side Hangzhou Greentown. He would make his debut on 12 March 2017 in a league game against Nei Mongol Zhongyou that ended in a 3-2 victory. On 8 March 2021, Wang officially announced his retirement from playing after he was unable to recover from injury before the start of the 2021 China League One season.

Career statistics 
Statistics accurate as of match played 31 December 2020.

References

External links

Player stats at Sohu.com

1989 births
Living people
Chinese footballers
Footballers from Tianjin
Shanghai Shenhua F.C. players
Tianjin Jinmen Tiger F.C. players
Zhejiang Professional F.C. players
Chinese Super League players
China League One players
China League Two players
Association football midfielders